Farakh Ajaib  (born 3 February 1991) is a Pakistani  professional snooker player from Lancashire.

Career
In 2018, Ajaib was crowned the inaugural East Lancashire Snooker Championship winner. He was a ‘top-up’ player for several main tour events in 2018/19 – reward for a solid 2018 Q School campaign. At the Q School 2020 – Event 3 at the English Institute of Sport in Sheffield, Ajaib clinched a two-year Tour Card on to the 2020–21 and 2021–22 snooker seasons.

At the 2020 English Open, Ajaib defeated Rod Lawler 4–0 before losing 4–3 to Zhou Yuelong in a close match described as a “marathon”.

Competing at the 2022 European Masters in August, 2022 Ajaib lost to Judd Trump in a deciding frame in a last 16 match in which Ajaib had trailed 4-2 but had left Trump needing three snookers at 4-4.

Performance and rankings timeline

Amateur finals: 1 (1 title)

References

1991 births
Sportspeople from Blackburn
English snooker players
Living people
English people of Pakistani descent
Pakistani snooker players